Sebastiaan De Wilde (born 2 February 1993) is a Belgian professional footballer who plays as a centre back for Knokke.

Career
De Wilde played youth football for Eendracht Laarne, Lokeren and Anderlecht. In the summer of 2013, he decided to leave Anderlecht to sign a contract with FC Eindhoven. He made his debut on 25 October 2013 in a 3–1 home loss to Excelsior, coming on as a substitute in the second half for Jasper Waalkens. His first goals followed in the 2016–17 season, his first being a first-half goal on 30 October 2016 against Cambuur. In March 2017, his expiring contract was extended by one year.

In May 2018, De Wilde moved to Lommel on a free transfer, signing a two-year contract. In May 2019, De Wilde and Lommel decided to terminate the agreement by mutual consent.

Ahead of the 2019–20 season, De Wilde joined Knokke on a three-year contract.

References

External links
 

1993 births
Living people
Belgian footballers
Belgian expatriate footballers
FC Eindhoven players
Lommel S.K. players
Eerste Divisie players
Challenger Pro League players
Association football defenders
People from Wetteren
K.S.C. Lokeren Oost-Vlaanderen players
R.S.C. Anderlecht players
Expatriate footballers in the Netherlands
Belgian expatriate sportspeople in the Netherlands
Footballers from East Flanders